Nigel Shaun Scrutton (born 2 April 1964)  is a British biochemist and biotechnology innovator known for his work on enzyme catalysis, biophysics and synthetic biology. He is Director of the UK Future Biomanufacturing Research Hub, Director of the Fine and Speciality Chemicals Synthetic Biology Research Centre (SYNBIOCHEM), and Co-founder, Director and Chief Scientific Officer of the 'fuels-from-biology' company C3 Biotechnologies Ltd. He is Professor of Enzymology and Biophysical Chemistry in the Department of Chemistry at the University of Manchester. He is former Director of the Manchester Institute of Biotechnology (MIB) (2010 to 2020).

Early life and education
Scrutton was born in Batley, West Riding of Yorkshire and was brought up in Cleckheaton where he went to Whitcliffe Mount School. Scrutton graduated from King's College London with a first class Bachelor of Science degree in Biochemistry in 1985. He was a Benefactors' Scholar at St John's College, Cambridge where he completed his doctoral research (PhD) in 1988 supervised by Richard Perham. He was a Research Fellow of St John's College, Cambridge (1989–92) and a Fellow / Director of Studies at Churchill College, Cambridge (1992–95). He was awarded a Doctor of Science (ScD) degree in 2003 by the University of Cambridge.

Career and research
Following his PhD, Scrutton was appointed as Lecturer (1995), then Reader (1997) and Professor (1999) at the University of Leicester before being appointed Professor at the University of Manchester in 2005. He has held successive research fellowships over 29 years from the Royal Commission for the Exhibition of 1851 (1851 Research Fellowship), St John's College, Cambridge, the Royal Society (Royal Society University Research Fellow and Royal Society Wolfson Research Merit Award), the Lister Institute of Preventive Medicine, the Biotechnology and Biological Sciences Research Council (BBSRC) and the Engineering and Physical Sciences Research Council (EPSRC). He has been Visiting Professor at Tsinghua University (Beijing, China) and Cardiff University (UK), and adjunct professor at VISTEC (Thailand) and Beijing University of Chemical Technology (China).

He has made major contributions to the study of enzyme catalysis, the mechanisms and structures of enzymes and the photochemistry of photoreceptor proteins. His group has pioneered investigations that have led to both deep understanding and recognition of the general importance of quantum tunnelling and protein dynamics in enzyme H-transfer and conformational ensemble sampling in electron transfer reactions. This has involved the development of new biophysical approaches for reaction kinetics analysis including kinetic isotope effect studies, their integration into structural and computational programmes, and extension of theory. He has also made important contributions to enzyme kinetics, coenzyme chemistry, protein engineering, directed evolution, synthetic biology, biological engineering, biocatalysis and metabolic engineering, including the first rational redesign of the coenzyme specificity of an enzyme, the establishment of automated microorganism bioengineering platforms for the production of chemicals (e.g. fuels, materials, active pharmaceutical ingredients) and the discovery of new riboflavin cofactors.

His research has been funded by the Engineering and Physical Sciences Research Council, the Biotechnology and Biological Sciences Research Council. the Defence Science and Technology Laboratory, the Office of Naval Research Global, the European Union (Framework Programmes for Research and Technological Development) and other industry / charity funders. He has supervised about 60 students for the degree of Doctor of Philosophy, about 50 postdoctoral research workers. He has published over 500 research papers and several patents.

In 2015 Scrutton co-founded the company C3 Biotechnologies Ltd to commercialise technologies for fuels and chemicals production, and subsidiary companies C3 Biotechnologies (Maritime and Aerospace, UK) Ltd in 2020, and C3 Biotechnologies (Maritime and Aerospace, USA) Inc in 2022.

He is Director of the Manchester Synthetic Biology Research Centre SYNBIOCHEM, which he established in 2014 following major investment by the UK government in synthetic biology. In 2019, he established and became Director of the UK Future Biomanufacturing Research Hub, which is developing new technologies to accelerate bio-based manufacturing in the UK in three key sectors – pharmaceuticals, chemicals and engineering materials. He has served on several national committees, including research council / funding committees (BBSRC, EPSRC, Royal Society) and strategic advisory boards / scientific steering groups (e.g. Science and Technology Facilities Council). He is a member of BBSRC Council.

Under his leadership as Director, the enterprising vision of MIB was recognised by the award of the Queen's Anniversary Prize for Higher and Further Education (2018–20) as 'a leader in the UK’s strategic development of biotechnology and bio-manufacturing, through innovative technologies in partnerships with industry'.

Awards and honours
Scrutton was awarded the Colworth Medal in 1999 from the Biochemical Society; the Enzyme Chemistry Award (Charmian Medal) from the Royal Society of Chemistry in 2002; the Rita and John Cornforth Award from the Royal Society of Chemistry in 2009; the Interdisciplinary Prize from the Royal Society of Chemistry in 2019.

Scrutton was elected a Fellow of the Royal Society (FRS) in 2020; Fellow of the Royal Society of Chemistry (FRSC) in 1996; a Fellow of the Royal Society of Biology (FRSB) in 2009; a Member of the Lister Institute in 2004.

He is recipient of a number of academic awards including: Sambrooke Exhibition Prize (King's College London, University of London, 1983); William Robson Prize (King's College London, University of London, 1985); Benefactors' Scholarship (St John's College, University of Cambridge, 1985); Henry Humphreys Research Prize / Research Fellowship (St John's College, University of Cambridge, 1989).

Personal life
Scrutton married Nia Francis Roberts in 1989 with whom he has two sons and one daughter.

References

External links
 Nigel Scrutton's University of Manchester official website
 Nigel Scrutton's research group website
 SYNBIOCHEM website
 Future Biomanufacturing Research Hub website
 C3 Biotechnologies Ltd official website

1964 births
Living people
Alumni of King's College London
Alumni of St John's College, Cambridge
Academics of the University of Leicester
Academics of the University of Manchester
Fellows of the Royal Society of Chemistry
Fellows of the Royal Society of Biology
Royal Society University Research Fellows
Fellows of the Royal Society
British biochemists
Quantum biology